The Faisalabad Canal Expressway (Urdu,) is a 27-km city district expressway located in Faisalabad, Punjab, Pakistan.

In July 2015, Rana Sanaullah, Punjab Law Minister told news reporters in Faisalabad that the new 25-kilometre Faisalabad Canal Expressway would offer signal-free travel from Sahianwala to Samundari.

See also
 Roads in Pakistan

References

Transport in Faisalabad District
Expressways in Pakistan